2022 Melbourne Summer Set may refer to:

2022 Melbourne Summer Set 1
2022 Melbourne Summer Set 2